The 1860 United States presidential election  was the 19th quadrennial presidential election, held on Tuesday, November 6, 1860. In a four-way contest, the Republican Party ticket of Abraham Lincoln and Hannibal Hamlin, absent from the ballot in ten slave states, won a national popular plurality, a popular majority in the North where states already had abolished slavery, and a national electoral majority comprising only Northern electoral votes. Lincoln's election thus served as the main catalyst of the American Civil War. This marked the first time that a Republican was elected president.

The United States had become increasingly sectionally divided during the 1850s, primarily over extending slavery into the western territories. The incumbent president, James Buchanan, like his predecessor, Franklin Pierce, was a Northern Democrat with Southern sympathies. Buchanan also adamantly promised not to seek re-election. From the mid-1850s, the anti-slavery Republican Party became a major political force, driven by Northern voter opposition to the Kansas–Nebraska Act and the Supreme Court's 1857 decision in Dred Scott v. Sandford. From the election of 1856, the Republican Party had replaced the defunct Whig Party as the major opposition to the Democrats. A group of former Whigs and Know Nothings formed the Constitutional Union Party, which sought to avoid disunion by resolving divisions over slavery with some new compromise.

The 1860 Republican National Convention in Chicago nominated Abraham Lincoln, a moderate former one-term Whig Representative from Illinois. Its platform promised not to interfere with slavery in the South but opposed extension of slavery into the territories. The 1860 Democratic National Convention adjourned in Charleston, South Carolina, without agreeing on a nominee, but a second convention in Baltimore, Maryland, nominated Illinois Senator Stephen A. Douglas. Douglas's support for the concept of popular sovereignty, which called for each territory's settlers to decide locally on the status of slavery, alienated many radical pro-slavery Southern Democrats, who wanted the territories, and perhaps other lands, open to slavery. With President Buchanan's support, Southern Democrats held their own convention, nominating Vice President John C. Breckinridge of Kentucky. The 1860 Constitutional Union Convention nominated a ticket led by former Tennessee Senator John Bell.

Lincoln's main opponent in the North was Douglas, who won the popular vote in two states, Missouri and New Jersey. Douglas was the only candidate in the 1860 election to win electoral votes in both free and slave states. In the South, Bell won three states and Breckinridge swept the remaining 11. Lincoln's election motivated seven Southern states, all voting for Breckinridge, to secede before the inauguration and the secession of four more, including two that voted for Bell, after Lincoln mobilized Federal troops to protect Federal property and coerce the seven initially seceding states. The election was the first of six consecutive Republican victories.

Nominations
The 1860 presidential election conventions were unusually tumultuous, due in particular to a split in the Democratic Party that led to rival conventions.

Republican nomination

Republican candidates:

 Abraham Lincoln, former representative from Illinois
 William Seward, senator from New York
 Simon Cameron, senator from Pennsylvania
 Salmon P. Chase, governor of Ohio
 Edward Bates, former representative from Missouri
 John McLean, associate justice of the U.S. Supreme Court
 Benjamin Wade, senator from Ohio
 William L. Dayton, former senator from New Jersey

Republican Party candidates gallery

The Republican National Convention met in mid-May 1860 after the Democrats had been forced to adjourn their convention in Charleston. With the Democrats in disarray and a sweep of the Northern states possible, the Republicans felt confident going into their convention in Chicago. William H. Seward from New York was considered the front-runner, followed by Salmon P. Chase from Ohio, and Missouri's Edward Bates. Abraham Lincoln from Illinois, was lesser-known, and was not considered to have a good chance against Seward. Seward had been governor and senator of New York and was an able politician with a Whig background. Also running were John C. Frémont, William L. Dayton, Cassius M. Clay, and Benjamin Wade, who might be able to win if the convention deadlocked.

As the convention developed, however, it was revealed that frontrunners Seward, Chase, and Bates had each alienated factions of the Republican Party. Seward had (undeservingly) been painted as a radical, and his speeches on slavery predicted inevitable conflict, which spooked moderate delegates. He also was firmly opposed to nativism, which further weakened his position. He had also been abandoned by his longtime friend and political ally Horace Greeley, publisher of the influential New-York Tribune.

Chase, a former Democrat, had alienated many of the former Whigs by his coalition with the Democrats in the late 1840s. He had also opposed tariffs demanded by Pennsylvania and even had opposition from his own delegation from Ohio. However, Chase's firm antislavery stance made him popular with the radical Republicans. But what he offered in policy he lacked in charisma and political acumen.

The conservative Bates was an unlikely candidate but found support from Horace Greeley, who sought any chance to defeat Seward, with whom he now had a bitter feud. Bates outlined his positions on the extension of slavery into the territories and equal constitutional rights for all citizens, positions that alienated his supporters in the border states and Southern conservatives, while German Americans in the party opposed Bates because of his past association with the Know Nothings.

Into this mix came Lincoln. Lincoln was not unknown; he had gained prominence in the Lincoln–Douglas debates and had represented Illinois in the House of Representatives. He had been quietly eyeing a run since the Lincoln-Douglas debates in 1858, ensuring that the debates were widely published and that a biography of himself was published. He gained great notability with his February 1860 Cooper Union speech, which may have ensured him the nomination. He had not yet announced his intentions to run, but it was a superb speech. Delivered in Seward's home state and attended by Greeley, Lincoln used the speech to show that the Republican party was a party of moderates, not crazed fanatics, as the South and Democrats claimed. Afterward, Lincoln was in much demand for speaking engagements. As the convention approached, Lincoln did not campaign actively, as the "office was expected to seek the man". So it did at the Illinois state convention, a week before the national convention. Young politician Richard Oglesby had secretly found several fence rails from the Hanks-Lincoln farm that Lincoln may have split as a youngster and paraded them into the convention with a banner that proclaimed Lincoln to be "The Rail Candidate" for president. Lincoln received a thunderous ovation, surpassing his and his political allies' expectations. Lincoln's campaign managers had printed and distributed thousands of fake convention admission tickets to Lincoln supporters to ensure and increase the crowd's support.

Even with such support from his home state, Lincoln faced a difficult task if he was to win the nomination. He set about ensuring that he was the second choice of most delegates, realizing that the first round of voting at the convention was unlikely to produce a clear winner. He engineered that the convention would happen in Chicago, which would be inherently friendly to the Illinois-based Lincoln. He also made sure that the Illinois delegation would vote as a bloc for him. Lincoln did not attend the convention in person and left the task of delegate wrangling to several close friends.

The first round of voting predictably produced a lead for Seward, but not a majority, with Lincoln in second place. The second round eliminated most of the minor contenders, with voters switching to Seward or mostly to Lincoln. The convention remained deadlocked, however, and skillful political maneuvering by Lincoln's delegate wranglers convinced the delegates to abandon Seward in favor of Lincoln. Lincoln's combination of a moderate stance on slavery, long support for economic issues, his western origins, and strong oratory proved to be exactly what the delegates wanted in a president. On the third ballot on May 18, Lincoln secured the presidential nomination overwhelmingly. Senator Hannibal Hamlin from Maine was nominated for vice president, defeating Cassius M. Clay. Hamlin was surprised by his nomination, saying he was "astonished" and that he "neither expected nor desired it."

The party platform promised not to interfere with slavery in the states, but opposed slavery in the territories. The platform promised tariffs protecting industry and workers, a Homestead Act granting free farmland in the West to settlers, and the funding of a transcontinental railroad. There was no mention of Mormonism (which had been condemned in the Party's 1856 platform), the Fugitive Slave Act, personal liberty laws, or the Dred Scott decision. While the Seward forces were disappointed at the nomination of a little-known western upstart, they rallied behind Lincoln, while abolitionists were angry at the selection of a moderate and had little faith in Lincoln.

Democratic (Northern Democratic) Party nomination

Northern Democratic candidates:
 Stephen Douglas, senator from Illinois
 James Guthrie, former treasury secretary from Kentucky
 Robert Mercer Taliaferro Hunter, senator from Virginia
 Joseph Lane, senator from Oregon
 Daniel S. Dickinson, former senator from New York
 Andrew Johnson, senator from Tennessee

Democratic Party candidates gallery

At the Democratic National Convention held in Institute Hall in Charleston, South Carolina, in April 1860, 50 Southern Democrats walked out over a platform dispute, led by the extreme pro-slavery "Fire-Eater" William Lowndes Yancey and the Alabama delegation: following them were the entire delegations of Florida, Georgia, Louisiana, Mississippi, South Carolina and Texas, three of the four delegates from Arkansas, and one of the three delegates from Delaware.

Six candidates were running: Stephen A. Douglas from Illinois, James Guthrie from Kentucky, Robert Mercer Taliaferro Hunter from Virginia, Joseph Lane from Oregon, Daniel S. Dickinson from New York, and Andrew Johnson from Tennessee, while three other candidates, Isaac Toucey from Connecticut, James Pearce from Maryland, and Jefferson Davis from Mississippi (the future president of the Confederate States) also received votes.

Douglas, a moderate on the slavery issue who favored "popular sovereignty", was ahead on the first ballot, but was 56½ votes short of securing the nomination. On the 57th ballot, with Douglas was still ahead, but 51½ votes short of the nomination, the exhausted and desperate delegates agreed on May 3 to cease voting and adjourn the convention.

While the Democrats convened again at the Front Street Theater in Baltimore, Maryland, on June 18, 110 Southern delegates (led by "Fire-Eaters") boycotted the convention or walked out after the convention informed them they would not adopt a resolution supporting extending slavery into territories whose voters did not want it.

While some considered Horatio Seymour a compromise candidate for the National Democratic nomination at the reconvening convention in Baltimore, Seymour wrote a letter to the editor of his local newspaper declaring unreservedly that he was not a candidate for either spot on the ticket. After two ballots - the 59th ballot overall - the remaining Democrats nominated Stephen A. Douglas from Illinois for president. The election would now pit Lincoln against his longtime political rival, whom Lincoln had lost to in the Illinois senate race just two years earlier. That two candidates were from Illinois showed the importance of the West in the election.

While Benjamin Fitzpatrick from Alabama was nominated for vice president, he refused the nomination.

After the convention concluded with no vice presidential nominee, Douglas offered the vice presidential nomination to Herschel V. Johnson from Georgia, who accepted.

Southern Democratic Party nomination

Southern Democratic candidates:

 John C. Breckinridge, Vice President of the United States
 Daniel S. Dickinson, former senator from New York
 Robert Mercer Taliaferro Hunter, senator from Virginia
 Joseph Lane, senator from Oregon
 Jefferson Davis, senator from Mississippi

Southern Democratic Party candidates gallery

The delegates who walked out of the convention at Charleston  reconvened in Richmond, Virginia on June 11. When the Democrats reconvened in Baltimore, they rejoined (except South Carolina and Florida, who had stayed in Richmond).

When the convention seated two replacement delegations on June 18, they walked out again or boycotted the convention, accompanied by nearly all other Southern delegates and erstwhile Convention chair Caleb Cushing, a New Englander and former member of Franklin Pierce's cabinet.

This larger group met immediately in Baltimore's Institute Hall, with Cushing again presiding. They adopted the pro-slavery platform rejected at Charleston, and nominated Vice President John C. Breckinridge for president, and Senator Joseph Lane from Oregon for vice president.

Yancey and some (less than half) of the bolters - almost entirely from the Lower South - met on June 28 in Richmond, along with the South Carolina and Florida delegations, at a convention that affirmed the nominations of Breckinridge and Lane.

Besides the Democratic Parties in the Southern states, the Breckinridge/Lane ticket was also supported by the Buchanan administration. Buchanan's own continued prestige in his home state of Pennsylvania ensured that Breckinridge would be the principal Democratic candidate in that populous state. Breckinridge was the last sitting vice president nominated for president until Richard Nixon in 1960.

Constitutional Union Party nomination

Constitutional Union candidates:

 John Bell, former senator from Tennessee
 Sam Houston, governor of Texas
 John J. Crittenden, senator from Kentucky
 Edward Everett, former senator from Massachusetts
 William A. Graham, former senator from North Carolina
 William C. Rives, former senator from Virginia

The Constitutional Union Party was formed by remnants of both the defunct Know Nothing and Whig Parties who were unwilling to join either the Republicans or the Democrats. The new party's members hoped to stave off Southern secession by avoiding the slavery issue. They met in the Eastside District Courthouse of Baltimore and nominated John Bell from Tennessee for president over Governor Sam Houston of Texas on the second ballot. Edward Everett was nominated for vice president at the convention on May 9, 1860, one week before Lincoln.

John Bell was a former Whig who had opposed the Kansas–Nebraska Act and the Lecompton Constitution. Edward Everett had been president of Harvard University and Secretary of State in the Millard Fillmore administration. The party platform advocated compromise to save the Union with the slogan "The Union as it is, and the Constitution as it is."

Liberty (Union) Party nomination
Liberty (Union) candidates:
 Gerrit Smith, former representative from New York

Liberty Party (Radical Abolitionists, Union) candidates gallery

By 1860, very little remained of the Liberty Party, after most of its membership left to join the Free Soil Party in 1848 and nearly all of what remained of it joined the Republicans in 1854. The remaining party was also called the Radical Abolitionists. A convention of one hundred delegates was held in Convention Hall, Syracuse, New York, on August 29, 1860. Delegates were in attendance from New York, Pennsylvania, New Jersey, Michigan, Illinois, Ohio, Kentucky, and Massachusetts. Several of the delegates were women.

Gerrit Smith, a prominent abolitionist and the 1848 presidential nominee of the original Liberty Party, had sent a letter in which he stated that his health had been so poor that he had not been able to be away from home since 1858. Nonetheless, he remained popular in the party because he had helped inspire some of John Brown's supporters at the Raid on Harpers Ferry. In his letter, Smith donated $50 to pay for the printing of ballots in the various states.

There was quite a spirited contest between the friends of Gerrit Smith and William Goodell in regard to the nomination for the presidency. In spite of his professed ill health, Gerrit Smith was nominated for president and Samuel McFarland from Pennsylvania was nominated for vice president.

In Ohio, Illinois, and Indiana, slates of presidential electors pledged to Smith and McFarland ran with the name of the Union Party. They received a total of 176 votes in the general election, 0.004% of the total.

People's Party nomination

The People's Party was a loose association of the supporters of Governor Samuel Houston. On April 20, 1860, the party held what it termed a national convention to nominate Houston for president on the San Jacinto Battlefield in Texas. Houston's supporters at the gathering did not nominate a vice presidential candidate, since they expected later gatherings to carry out that function. Later mass meetings were held in northern cities, such as New York City on May 30, 1860, but they too failed to nominate a vice presidential candidate. Houston, never enthusiastic about running for the presidency, soon became convinced that he had no chance of winning and that his candidacy would only make it easier for the Republican candidate to win. He withdrew from the race on August 16, and urged the formation of a Unified "Union" ticket in opposition to Lincoln.

Political considerations

In their campaigning, Bell and Douglas both claimed that disunion would not necessarily follow a Lincoln election. Nonetheless, loyal army officers in Virginia, Kansas and South Carolina warned Lincoln of military preparations to the contrary. Secessionists threw their support behind Breckinridge in an attempt either to force the anti-Republican candidates to coordinate their electoral votes or throw the election into the House of Representatives, where the selection of the president would be made by the representatives elected in 1858, before the Republican majorities in both House and Senate achieved in 1860 were seated in the new 37th Congress. Mexican War hero Winfield Scott suggested to Lincoln that he assume the powers of a commander-in-chief before inauguration. However, historian Bruce Chadwick observes that Lincoln and his advisors ignored the widespread alarms and threats of secession as mere election trickery.

Indeed, voting in the South was not as monolithic as the Electoral College map would make it seem. Economically, culturally, and politically, the South was made up of three regions. In the states of the "Upper" South, later known as the "Border States" (Delaware, Maryland, Kentucky, and Missouri along with the Kansas territories), unionist popular votes were scattered among Lincoln, Douglas, and Bell, to form a majority in all four. In the "Middle" South states, there was a unionist majority divided between Douglas and Bell in Virginia and Tennessee; in North Carolina and Arkansas, the unionist (Bell and Douglas) vote approached a majority. Texas was the only Middle South state that Breckinridge carried convincingly. In three of the six "Deep" South states, unionists (Bell and Douglas) won divided majorities in Georgia and Louisiana or neared it in Alabama. Breckinridge convincingly carried only three of the six states of the Deep South (South Carolina, Florida, and Mississippi). These three Deep South states were all among the four Southern states with the lowest white populations; together, they held only nine percent of Southern whites.

Among the slave states, the three states with the highest voter turnouts voted the most one-sided. Texas, with five percent of the total wartime South's population, voted 75 percent Breckinridge. Kentucky and Missouri, with one-fourth the total population, voted 73 percent pro-union Bell, Douglas and Lincoln. In comparison, the six states of the Deep South making up one-fourth the Confederate voting population, split 57 percent Breckinridge versus 43 percent for the two pro-union candidates. The four states that were admitted to the Confederacy after Fort Sumter held almost half its population, and voted a narrow combined majority of 53 percent for the pro-union candidates.

In the eleven states that would later declare their secession from the Union and be controlled by Confederate armies, ballots for Lincoln were cast only in Virginia,
where he received 1,929 votes (1.15 percent of the total). Unsurprisingly, the vast majority of the votes Lincoln received were cast in border counties of what would soon become West Virginia – the future state accounted for 1,832 of Lincoln's 1,929 votes.

Lincoln received no votes at all in 121 of the state's then-145 counties (including 31 of the 50 that would form West Virginia), received a single vote in three counties and received ten or fewer votes in nine of the 24 counties where he polled votes. Lincoln's best results, by far, were in the four counties that comprised the state's northern panhandle, a region which had long felt alienated from Richmond, was economically and culturally linked to its neighbors Ohio and Pennsylvania and would become the key driver in the successful effort to form a separate state. Hancock County (Virginia's northernmost at the time) returned Lincoln's best result – he polled over 40% of the vote there and finished in second place (Lincoln polled only eight votes fewer than Breckinridge). Of the 97 votes cast for Lincoln in the state's post-1863 boundaries, 93 were polled in four counties along the Potomac River and four were tallied in the coastal city of Portsmouth.

Some key differences between modern elections and the those of the mid-nineteenth century are that at the time, not only was there was no secret ballot anywhere in the United States, but the state did not print and distribute ballots. In theory, any document containing a valid or at least non-excessive number names of citizens of a particular state (provided they were eligible to vote in the electoral college within that state) might have been accepted as a valid presidential ballot, however what this meant in practice was that a candidate's campaign was responsible for printing and distributing their own ballots (this service was typically done by supportive newspaper publishers). Moreover, since voters did not choose the president directly, but rather presidential electors, the only way for a voter to meaningfully support a particular candidate for president was cast a ballot for citizens of his state who would have pledged to vote for the candidate in the Electoral College. In ten southern slave states, no citizen would publicly pledge to vote for Abraham Lincoln, so citizens there had no legal means to vote for the Republican nominee. In most of Virginia, no publisher would print ballots for Lincoln's pledged electors. While a citizen without access to a ballot for Lincoln could theoretically have still voted for him by means of a write-in ballot provided his state had electors pledged to Lincoln and the voter knew their identities, casting a ballot in favor of the Republican candidate in a strongly pro-slavery county would have incurred (at minimum) social ostracization (of course, casting a vote for Breckinridge in a strongly abolitionist county ran a voter the same risk).

In the four slave states that did not secede (Missouri, Kentucky, Maryland, and Delaware), Lincoln came in fourth in every state except Delaware (where he finished third). Within the fifteen slave states, Lincoln won only two counties out of 996, Missouri's St. Louis and Gasconade Counties. In the 1856 election, the Republican candidate for president had received no votes at all in twelve of the fourteen slave states with a popular vote (these being the same states as in the 1860 election, plus Missouri and Virginia).

Results

The election was held on Tuesday, November 6, 1860, and was noteworthy for the exaggerated sectionalism and voter enthusiasm in a country that was soon to dissolve into civil war. Voter turnout was 81.2%, the highest in American history up to that time, and the second-highest overall (exceeded only in the election of 1876).

Since Andrew Jackson had won re-election in 1832, all six subsequent presidents had only won one term, while the last four of those had won with a popular vote under 51 percent.

Lincoln won the Electoral College with less than 40 percent of the popular vote nationwide by carrying states above the Mason–Dixon line and north of the Ohio River, plus the states of California and Oregon in the Far West. Unlike every preceding president-elect, Lincoln did not carry even one slave state.

There were no ballots distributed for Lincoln in ten of the Southern states: Alabama, Arkansas, Florida, Georgia, Louisiana, Mississippi, North Carolina, South Carolina, Tennessee, and Texas.
Lincoln was therefore the second President-elect to poll no votes in some states which had a popular vote (the first was John Quincy Adams, who polled no ballots in the popular votes of two states in the election of 1824, the only other election in which there were four major candidates, none of whom distributed ballots in every state). It should be further noted that, prior to introduction of the secret ballot in the 1880s, the concept of ballot access did not exist in the sense it does today: there was no standardized state-issued ballot for a candidate to "appear" on. Instead, presidential ballots were printed and distributed by agents of the candidates and their parties, who organized slates of would-be electors publicly pledged to vote for a particular candidate. The 1824 and 1860 presidential elections were the only two prior to the introduction of the secret ballot where a winning candidate was so unpopular in a particular region that it was impossible to organize and print ballots for a slate of eligible voters pledged to vote for that candidate in an entire state.

Since 1860, and excluding unreconstructed Southern states in 1868 and 1872, there have been two occasions where a Republican presidential candidate failed to poll votes in every state, while national Democratic candidates have failed to appear on all state ballots in three elections since the introduction of the secret ballot, though in all three, the Democratic candidate nonetheless won the presidency , but none of them were off the ballot in as many states as Lincoln in 1860.

Lincoln won the second-lowest share of the popular vote among all winning presidential candidates in U.S. history. Lincoln's share of the popular vote would likely have been even lower if there had been a popular vote in South Carolina, though conversely it would likely have been marginally higher had he been on the ballot in all of the Southern states. The Republican victory resulted from the concentration of votes in the free states, which together controlled a majority of the presidential electors.

Lincoln's strategy was deliberately focused, in collaboration with Republican Party Chairman Thurlow Weed, on expanding on the states Frémont won four years earlier: New York was critical with 35 Electoral College votes, 11.5 percent of the total, and with Pennsylvania (27) and Ohio (23) as well, a candidate could collect 85 votes, whereas 152 were required to win. The Wide Awakes young Republican men's organization massively expanded registered voter lists, and although Lincoln was not even on the ballot in most Southern states, population increases in the free states had far exceeded those seen in the slave states for many years before the election of 1860, hence free states dominated in the Electoral College.

The split in the Democratic party is sometimes held responsible for Lincoln's victory despite the fact that Lincoln won the election with less than 40% of the popular vote, as much of the anti-Republican vote was "wasted" in Southern states in which no ballots for Lincoln were circulated. Lincoln also won outright majorities in enough states, that if he lost all states that he took with pluralities, he would still have enough electoral votes to win.

At most, a single opponent nationwide would have deprived Lincoln of only California, Oregon, and four New Jersey electors, whose combined total of eleven electoral votes would have made no difference to the result since every other state won by the Republicans was won by a clear majority of the vote: in this scenario, Lincoln would have received 169 electoral votes, 17 more than the 152 required to win.

In the four states of New York, Rhode Island, Pennsylvania and New Jersey where anti-Lincoln votes were combined into fusion tickets, Lincoln still won three and split New Jersey; despite this, a shift of 25,000 votes to the fusion ticket in New York would have left Lincoln with 145 electoral votes - seven votes short of winning the Electoral College - and forced a contingent election in the House of Representatives. Of the five states that Lincoln failed to carry despite polling votes, he received 20 percent of the vote in only one (Delaware), and 10 percent of the vote in only one more (Missouri).

Like Lincoln, Breckinridge and Bell won no electoral votes outside of their respective sections. While Bell retired to his family business, quietly supporting his state's secession, Breckinridge served as a Confederate general. He finished second in the Electoral College with 72 votes, carrying eleven of fifteen slave states (including South Carolina, whose electors were chosen by the state legislature, not popular vote). Breckinridge stood a distant third in national popular vote at eighteen percent, but accrued 50 to 75 percent in the first seven states that would form the Confederate States of America. He took nine of the eleven states that eventually joined, plus the border slave states of Delaware and Maryland, losing only Virginia and Tennessee. Breckinridge received very little support in the free states, showing some strength only in California, Oregon, Pennsylvania and Connecticut.

Bell carried three slave states (Tennessee, Kentucky, and Virginia) and lost Maryland by only 722 votes. Nevertheless, he finished a remarkable second in all slave states won by Breckinridge or Douglas. He won 45 to 47 percent in Maryland, Tennessee and North Carolina and canvassed respectably with 36 to 40 percent in Missouri, Arkansas, Louisiana, Georgia, and Florida. Bell himself had hoped that he would take over the former support of the extinct Whig Party in free states, but the majority of this support went to Lincoln. Thus, except for running mate Everett's home state of Massachusetts, and California, Bell received even less support in the free states than did Breckinridge, and consequently came in last in the national popular vote, at 12.62%.

Douglas was the only candidate who won electoral votes in both slave and free states (free New Jersey and slave Missouri). His support was the most widespread geographically; he finished second behind Lincoln in the popular vote with 29.52%, but last in the Electoral College. Douglas attained a 28 to 47% share in the states of the Mid-Atlantic, Midwest, and Trans-Mississippi West, but slipped to 19 to 39% in New England. Outside his regional section, Douglas took 15 to 17% of the popular vote total in the slave states of Kentucky, Alabama, and Louisiana, then 10 percent or less in the nine remaining slave states. Douglas, in his "Norfolk Doctrine", reiterated in North Carolina, promised to keep the Union together by coercion if states proceeded to secede: the popular vote for Lincoln and Douglas combined was 69.17% of the turnout.

The 1860 Republican ticket was the first successful national ticket that did not feature a Southerner, and the election marked the end of Southern political dominance in the United States. Between 1789 and 1860, Southerners had been president for two-thirds of the era, and had held the offices of Speaker of the House and President pro tem of the Senate during much of that time. Moreover, since 1791, Southerners had comprised a majority of the Supreme Court.

Source (Popular Vote): 
Source (Electoral Vote): 

(a) The popular vote figures exclude South Carolina where the Electors were chosen by the state legislature rather than by popular vote.

Geography of results

Cartographic gallery

Results by state
Source: Data from Walter Dean Burnham, Presidential ballots, 1836–1892 (Johns Hopkins University Press, 1955) pp 247–57.

Close states

States where the margin of victory was under 1%:
Virginia 0.09% (156 votes)
Missouri 0.26% (429 votes)
California 0.61% (734 votes)
Maryland 0.79% (722 votes)

States where the margin of victory was under 5%:
Oregon 1.83% (270 votes)
Tennessee 3.17% (4,631 votes)
Illinois 3.52% (11,956 votes)
North Carolina 3.85% (3,717 votes)
New Jersey 3.74% (4,523 votes)
Louisiana 4.90% (2,477 votes)

States where the margin of victory was under 10%:
New York 7.42% (50,136 votes) (tipping point state for Lincoln's victory)
Ohio 7.94% (34,388 votes)
Georgia 8.63% (9,216 votes)
Indiana 8.65% (23,524 votes)
Kentucky 8.83% (12,915 votes)

Trigger for the Civil War

Lincoln's victory and imminent inauguration as president was the immediate cause for declarations of secession by seven Southern states (South Carolina, Mississippi, Florida, Alabama, Georgia, Louisiana, and Texas) from 20 December 1860 to 1 February 1861. They then formed the Confederate States of America.

Several other states also considered declaring secession at the time:

 Missouri convened a secession convention, which voted against secession and adjourned permanently.
 Arkansas convened a secession convention, which voted against secession and adjourned temporarily.
 Virginia convened a secession convention, which voted against secession but remained in session.
 Tennessee held a referendum on having a secession convention, which failed.
 North Carolina held a referendum on having a secession convention, which failed.

All of the secessionist activity was motivated by fear for the institution of slavery in the South. If the President (and, by extension, the appointed federal officials in the South, such as district attorneys, marshals, postmasters, and judges) opposed slavery, it might collapse. There were fears that abolitionist agents would infiltrate the South and foment slave insurrections. (The noted secessionist William Lowndes Yancey, speaking at New York's Cooper Institute in October 1860, asserted that with abolitionists in power, "Emissaries will percolate between master [and] slave as water between the crevices of rocks underground. They will be found everywhere, with strychnine to put in our wells.") Less radical Southerners thought that with Northern antislavery dominance of the federal government, slavery would eventually be abolished, regardless of present constitutional limits.

Bertram Wyatt-Brown argues that secessionists desired independence as necessary for their honor. They could no longer tolerate Northern state attitudes that regarded slave ownership as a great sin and Northern politicians who insisted on stopping the spread of slavery.

Another bloc of Southerners resented Northern criticism of slavery and restrictions on slavery but opposed secession as dangerous and unnecessary. However, the "conditional Unionists" also hoped that when faced with secession, Northerners would stifle anti-slavery rhetoric and accept pro-slavery rules for the territories. It was that group that prevented immediate secession in Virginia, North Carolina, Tennessee, and Arkansas when
Lincoln took office on 4 March 1861. He took no action against the secessionists in the seven "Confederate" states but also declared that secession had no legal validity and refused to surrender federal property in those states. (He also reiterated his opposition to slavery anywhere in the territories.) The standoff continued until mid-April, when Confederate President Jefferson Davis ordered Confederate troops to bombard and capture Fort Sumter.

Lincoln then called for troops to put down rebellion, which wiped out the possibility that the crisis could be resolved by compromise. Nearly all "conditional Unionists" joined the secessionists. The Virginia convention and the reconvened Arkansas convention both declared secession, as did the legislatures of Tennessee and North Carolina; all four states joined the Confederacy.

See also
 1860–61 United States House of Representatives elections
 1860–61 United States Senate elections
 American election campaigns in the 19th century
 Electoral history of Abraham Lincoln
 First inauguration of Abraham Lincoln
 John Hanks
 History of the United States (1849–1865)
 History of the United States Democratic Party
 History of the United States Republican Party
 Third Party System

Notes

References

Further reading

 
 
 Decredico, Mary A.  "Sectionalism and the Secession Crisis," in John B. Boles, ed., A Companion to the American South (2004) pp. 231-248, on the historiography of Southend motivations
 
 
 Fite, Emerson David. The Presidential campaign of 1860 (1911). online, classic narrative.
 
 Franson, Melissa. "Wide Awakes, Half Asleeps, Little Giants, and Bell Ringers: Political Partisanship in the Catskills of New York during the Elections of 1860 and 1862." New York History 102.1 (2021): 149-171. excerpt
 Fuller, A. James, ed. The Election of 1860 Reconsidered (Kent State Univ Press, 2013); 288 pp; essays by scholars;  online
  Thomas E. Rodgers, “Saving the Republic: Turnout, Ideology, and Republicanism in the Election of 1860,” in The Election of 1860 Reconsidered ch 6.
 Gabrial, B. "The Democrats Divide: Newspaper Coverage of the 1860 Presidential Conventions." in  In The Antebellum Press (Routledge. 2019) pp. 201-211.
 
 
 Grinspan, Jon, "'Young Men for War': The Wide Awakes and Lincoln's 1860 Presidential Campaign," Journal of American History 96.2 (2009): online.
 
 
 Holt, Michael F. The Election of 1860: "A Campaign Fraught with Consequences (2017) online review
 
 Johannsen, Robert W. Stephen A. Douglas (1973), standard biography
 
  along with Nevins, the most detailed narrative of the election
 Nevins, Allan. Ordeal of the Union (8 volumes, Macmillan, 1947–1971), detailed scholarly coverage of every election, 1848 to 1864. See vol 4 (1950) "The Emergence of Lincoln" vol 2 "Prologue to Civil War 1857-1861" pp 200-317 online
 Nichols, Roy Franklin. The Disruption of American Democracy (1948), pp. 348–506, focused on the Democratic party online
 Parks, Joseph Howard. John Bell of Tennessee (1950), standard biography
 
 
 
 Wells, Damon. Stephen Douglas: The Last Years, 1857–1861 (1971), online
 Woods, Michael E. Arguing Until Doomsday: Stephen Douglas, Jefferson Davis, and the Struggle for American Democracy (UNC Press Books, 2020). online review

Primary sources
 Chester, Edward W.  A Guide to Political Platforms (1977), pp. 72–79 online
 Porter, Kirk H. and Donald Bruce Johnson, eds. National Party Platforms, 1840-1964 (1965) online 1840-1956

External links

 1860 election: State-by-state Popular vote results
 1860 popular vote by counties
 Electoral Map from 1860
 Abraham Lincoln: Original Letters and Manuscripts, 1860  Shapell Manuscript Foundation
 Lincoln's election – details
 Report on 1860 Republican convention
 Abraham Lincoln: A Resource Guide from the Library of Congress
 Presidential Election of 1860: A Resource Guide from the Library of Congress
 Election of 1860 in Counting the Votes 

Origins of the American Civil War
 
Presidency of Abraham Lincoln
Abraham Lincoln
Secession crisis of 1860–61
November 1860 events